Wanguru, also Wang'uru or Mwea, is a town in Kenya. It is one of the urban centres in Kirinyaga County. Other towns in the county include Kagio, Sagana, Kerugoya and the county seat, Kutus.

Location
The coordinates of Wanguru are: 0°40'57.0"S, 37°21'25.0"E (Latitude:-0.682500; Longitude:37.356944).

Overview
Wanguru (Mwea) is a rapidly expanding urban center. The Mwea Irrigation Scheme, produces over 50 percent of all the rice grown in Kenya. The town is home to a number of rice stores and several rice mills, which operate throughout the year. Some sources estimate Mwea's contribution to the national rice basket at 80 percent.

See also
Thika Highway

References

External links
 How Serial Trader Overcame Failure To Build Empire From Grains Of Rice As of 22 June 2015.

Populated places in Kenya
Kirinyaga County